Ibrahim Turay (born 4 September 1993 in Waterloo, Sierra Leone) is a Sierra Leonean runner who competed at the 2012 Summer Olympics in the 200 m event. He was eliminated in the first round but finished with a personal best time of 21.90.

References

External links
 

1993 births
Living people
Sierra Leonean male sprinters
Olympic athletes of Sierra Leone
Athletes (track and field) at the 2012 Summer Olympics
Commonwealth Games competitors for Sierra Leone
Athletes (track and field) at the 2010 Commonwealth Games
People from Waterloo, Sierra Leone